LaGrange High School is a public high school in Lake Charles in southwestern Louisiana, United States. It is operated by the Calcasieu Parish School Board.

Athletics
LaGrange High athletics competes in the LHSAA.

Championships
Football Championships
(1) State Championship: 1938

Notable alumni
 Marcus Anderson (1977), professional football player for the Chicago Bears
 Don Breaux (1958), professional football player for the Denver Broncos and San Diego Chargers
 John Demarie (1963), professional football player for the Cleveland Browns
 Terry Fontenot (1999), NFL scout and college football player
 Ray Fontenot (1975), professional baseball player for the (New York Yankees, Chicago Cubs, and Minnesota Twins)
 Randy Roach (1969), mayor of Lake Charles from 2000 to 2017, member of the Louisiana House of Representatives from 1988 to 1986
 Jerry Wilson (defensive back) (1991), professional football player for primarily the Miami Dolphins and San Diego Chargers

References

External links
LaGrange High School

Public high schools in Louisiana
Schools in Calcasieu Parish, Louisiana
1903 establishments in Louisiana
Educational institutions established in 1903